The Synagogue in Sataniv, a town in Khmelnytskyi Oblast in Ukraine was built in 1514, which probably makes it the oldest existing synagogue in Ukraine.

History 
Most sources state 1514 or 1532 as the year of construction. But structural and stylistic features of the building, as well as a comparison with the nearby monastery, support the evidence that the synagogue was built at the beginning of the 17th century. This is further supported by chemical analysis of the mortar made in 1992, which showed that it is similar to the mortars of the mid-17th and early 18th century.

In 1933 the synagogue was confiscated by the soviet authorities and converted into a warehouse. In later years it stood empty and deteriorated. But in 2012 restoration work started and by now it is completed.

Architecture 
The synagogue, which had walls up to 2m thick, was a fortress synagogue. It was built in the style of the Polish renaissance. The main hall had rib vaults and was the men's prayer hall. Annexes to the west and south served as prayer-rooms for the women.  Worth mentioning are the lithic Holy Ark with fine ornaments as well as the main entrance, which is surmounted by a plaster frame. Inside the frame, there is a heraldic composition.

See also 
 List of synagogues in Ukraine

External links

References 

Synagogues in Ukraine
Fortress synagogues